The European Broadcasting Area (EBA) is defined by the International Telecommunication Union (ITU) as such:

The "European Broadcasting Area" is bounded on the west by the western boundary of Region 1, on the east by the meridian 40° East of Greenwich and on the south by the parallel 30° North so as to include the northern part of Saudi Arabia and that part of those countries bordering the Mediterranean within these limits. In addition, Armenia, Azerbaijan, Georgia and those parts of the territories of Iraq, Jordan, Syrian Arab Republic, Turkey and Ukraine lying outside the above limits are included in the European Broadcasting Area.

The EBA includes territory outside Europe, and excludes some territory that is part of the European continent. For example,
Armenia, Azerbaijan and Georgia were defined as outside the EBA borders until 2007. After the EBA was expanded by the 2007 World Radiocommunication Conference (WRC-07) to include those three countries, the only ITU member state with territory in Europe while remaining outside the EBA is Kazakhstan.

The boundaries of the European Broadcasting Area have their origin in the regions served and linked by telegraphy cables in the 19th and early 20th centuries. The European Broadcasting Area plays a part in the definition of eligibility for active membership in the European Broadcasting Union (EBU) and thus participation in the Eurovision Song Contest.  the European Broadcasting Union has 66 members from 55 countries, 31 associates from 20 countries, and 8 approved participants.

List of countries and territories within the EBA

ITU member states

Former ITU member states

Dependent territories and states with limited recognition
The following jurisdictions also rest inside the EBA borders, but cannot join the ITU or EBU due their dependent status or limited recognition:
Dependent territories
, overseas territory of the United Kingdom.
, constituent country of Denmark.
, overseas territory of the United Kingdom.
, Crown dependency of the United Kingdom.
, Crown dependency of the United Kingdom.
, Crown dependency of the United Kingdom.
States with limited recognition
, claimed as an autonomous republic of Georgia.
, claimed as part of Azerbaijan.
, claimed as an autonomous province of Serbia.
, claimed as part of Cyprus.
, disputed by Israel.
, claimed as part of Georgia.
, claimed as a territorial unit of Moldova.

Companies in the European Broadcasting Area 

Overview

The members of the European Broadcasting Union are able to provide their audience with a variety of channels in different countries. Every country included in the European Broadcasting Area consists of different companies that spread the news to the public in a multitude of ways. Below are some countries and the companies that deliver information and entertainment to their viewers in the European Broadcasting Area.

Companies

Algeria

The companies in Algeria are Etablissement Public de Radiodiffusion Sonore, Etablissment Public de Télévision Algérienne, and Télédiffusion d’Algérie. The Etablissement Public de Radiodiffusion Sonore is the main radio company in Algeria. It consists of three different radio stations that transmit programs talking about regional, local, or international life related to Algerian nationalism. There are three different radio national channels because each one transmits programs in different languages. The first channel transmits information in Arabic while the second and third channel use the French language. The Etablissment Public de Télévision Algérienne is the main television company in Algeria. The company's main motive is the same as Algeria's radio company which is to educate and entertain their audience with programs about regional, local, and international life along with current events from around the world. The company transmits their channel to Europe, North Africa, and parts of the Middle East. The Télédiffusion d’Algérie is in charge of distributing radio and television channels and programs through technological advancements.

Belgium

In Belgium, the companies are Radio-Télévision Belge de la Communauté française and Vlaamse Radio en Televisieomroep. Radio-Télévision Belge de la Communauté française (RTBF) is a public corporation that is focused on the needs of French speaking Belgian citizens and their aspiration is to educate and entertain their audience. Their ways of distributing information are four television channels, six radio stations, their webpage, and social networks. The Vlaamse Radio en Televisieomroep is a public service broadcasting company for Flemish people. Their focus is to provide information about the Flemish culture and identity in an open and diverse way. The company consists of a few radio stations and television news and sports programs.

Denmark

In Denmark, the companies are Danmarks Radio and TV 2 DANMARK. Danmarks Radio (DR) is the oldest Danish Broadcasting Corporation in Denmark with regard to electronic media business. Danmarks Radio broadcasts information about news and entertainment through six television channels, nine radio channels, orchestras, and apps. TV 2 DANMARK is a government-owned company and is Denmark's most watched channel with a number of sister channels.

Ireland

The companies in Ireland are Raidió Teilifís Éireann and TG4. Raidió Teilifís Éireann (RTÉ) is a public media organization in Ireland that grants their audience extensive multi-media services. RTÉ distributes their programs over seven television channels, nine radio stations, and their website. TG4 is a television channel known for its use of the Irish language. TV3 is an independent channel that is available on every television in Ireland with an average of 650,000 people tuning in to watch it a day.

France

Some of the companies in France are France Télévisions, France Médias Monde, and Radio France. France Télévisions is a television company owned by the government. It became France Télévisions with the consolidation of the television channels France 2, France 3, France 4, France 5, and France Ô. France Médias Monde controls France 24, RFI, and Monte Carlo Doualiya. The company is an international broadcasting service that transmits from the South of France to different parts of the world. France 24 is the international news channel, RFI is the international radio station, and Monte Carlo Doualiya is an Arab-speaking radio station. Radio France is a national broadcasting company made up of seven other channels and forty-four local stations.

Germany

Some of the companies in Germany are Deutsche Welle, Deutschland Radio, Rundfunk Berlin- Brandenburg, Saarländischer Rundfunk, and Südwestrundfunk. Deutsche Welle (DW) is Germany's international broadcasting service. DW is made up of six channels that transmit in 30 different languages internationally. Deutschland Radio is the German radio that consists of three programs. The German radio is a sign of nationalism because Germany did not have radio like other countries. The three programs are Germany Spark, Germany Kultur, and DRadio Knowledge. Germany Spark focuses on broadcasting information and is based in Cologne. Germany Kultur focuses on culture in the nation. Dradio Knowledge is an entertainment program that broadcasts pop culture news and music. Rundfunk Berlin- Brandenburg (RBB) is a merger of Sander Freies Berlin (SFB) company and the East German Rundfunk Brandenburg (ORB).  RBB consists of broadcasting information through television and radio channels. Saarländischer Rundfunk (SR) is a radio and television company in Germany. SR consists of four radio stations and three television programs. Südwestrundfunk (SWR) is a public media company with many radio and television programs. The SWR programs consist of SWR1, SWR 2, SWR 3, SWR 4, SWRinfo, DASDING, and SWR Classic.

Netherlands

In the Netherlands, some companies are KRO-NCRV, NTR, Nederlandse Omroep Stichting, Nerderlandse Publieke Omroep, and Omroep MAX. KRO-NCRV is a collaboration broadcaster made up of the association of KRO and the NCRV association. The company provides their audience with information about their society, their culture, and social needs. NTR an independent public service broadcaster that provides their viewers with unique programs. Nederlandse Omroep Stichting (NOS) is a television company that transmits national Dutch news and international news. NOS provides the Dutch viewers with information about news, sports, and events with a number of television programs. Nerderlandse Publieke Omroep (NPO) is a public service broadcaster for any who wants to watch or listen. NPO broadcasts through television and radio programs and social media. Omroep MAX is a public broadcasting service specially designed with programs for people of 50 years of age and older.

Sweden

In Sweden, the companies are Sveriges Radio Ab, Sverieges Television Sb, Swedish Educational Broadcasting Company. Sveriges Radio Ab (SR) is an independent radio company for the Swedish population. The company consists of 13 radio stations that broadcasts different information. Radio station P1 is for qualified news, P2 is for classical, jazz, and folk music, P3 is for mostly for the young adults with a variety of programs, P4 is for national and international news and pop music, etc. Sverieges Television Ab (SVT) is Sweden's public service television company. SVT consists of four channels which are SVT1, SVT2, SVT24, and SVT Barn/Kunskapskanalen. Swedish Educational Broadcasting Company (UR) is in collaboration with SR and SVT and focuses on broadcasting educational programs.

United Kingdom

The United Kingdom's companies are BBC, S4C (in the Welsh language), STV (in parts of Scotland), and the United Kingdom Independent Broadcasting.

Production in the EU and UK
Production figures in the European Union + the United Kingdom for TV fiction in 2015–2016, are:

See also
 International Telecommunication Union region

References

International broadcasting
European Broadcasting Union